MLB SlugFest: Loaded is a baseball video game developed by Point of View and published by Midway Games in 2004. It is the third game in the MLB Slugfest series. Sammy Sosa from the Chicago Cubs is the cover athlete.

Reception

The game received "generally favorable reviews" on both platforms according to the review aggregation website Metacritic.

References

External links
 

2004 video games
Baseball video games
Major League Baseball video games
Midway video games
North America-exclusive video games
PlayStation 2 games
Video games developed in the United States
Video games set in 2005
Xbox games
RenderWare games